GFK Jasenica 1911 (Serbian Cyrillic: ГФК Јасеница 1911) is a football club from Smederevska Palanka, Serbia. The club currently competes in the Podunavlje-Šumadija Zone League.

History
Founded on 3 September 1911, the club was originally called PSK (Palanački sport klub). The word "Jasenica" (after the river of the same name) was added to the name in 1922, making it PSK Jasenica. After the merger with Radnički in 1962, the club was renamed to Mladost. The club later became known as Mladost-Goša due to sponsorship reasons.

In 2005, the club was refounded as GFK Jasenica 1911 (Gradski fudbalski klub). Perica Ognjenović, a former player, became the honorary president of the club.

Honours
Dunav Zone League
 2010–11
Podunavlje District League
 2019–20

Coaching history
 Ljubiša Stamenković

External links
 Club page at Srbijasport.net

Football clubs in Serbia
Association football clubs established in 1911
1911 establishments in Serbia